Route 67 could refer to:
 one of several highways numbered 67
 London Buses route 67
 Melbourne tram route 67
 SEPTA Route 67